Matico is a Spanish language common name for several plants and may refer to:

 Aristeguietia glutinosa, known as matico in Ecuador
 Buddleja globosa, known as matico in Chile and Argentina
 Piper aduncum, known as matico in Peru